The Very Best of Sandie Shaw is a compilation album by the British singer Sandie Shaw. Released in 2005 by EMI, it contained digitally remastered versions of all her most popular hit singles from 1964 to 1988. It was the first compilation to feature the original recordings of all her UK chart hits.

Track listing

 "(There's) Always Something There to Remind Me"
 "Girl Don't Come"
 "I'll Stop at Nothing"
 "Long Live Love"
 "Message Understood"
 "How Can You Tell"
 "Tomorrow"
 "Nothing Comes Easy"
 "Run"
 "Think Sometimes About Me"
 "I Don't Need Anything"
 "Puppet on a String"
 "Tonight in Tokyo"
 "You've Not Changed"
 "Today"
 "Together"
 "Those Were the Days"
 "Monsieur Dupont"
 "Think It All Over"
 "Heaven Knows I'm Missing Him Now"
 "Rose Garden"
 "Father and Son"
 "Anyone Who Had a Heart"
 "Hand in Glove"
 "Are You Ready to Be Heartbroken"
 "Nothing Less Than Brilliant"

Sandie Shaw albums
2005 greatest hits albums
EMI Records compilation albums